Schesis onomaton ("state of nouns", from Ancient Greek  [skhésis, "state, condition, attitude"] and  [onomátōn, "of nouns"]), often misspelled scesis onomaton, was originally a rhetorical technique consisting of a sentence constructed only of nouns and adjectives. It later came to mean such a series of nouns and adjectives or any series of words that were synonymous expressions. In the second sense it is a rhetorical technique used to emphasize an idea by repeating it rapidly using slightly different words that have the same or a very similar meaning.

Examples of first meaning

Examples of second meaning

References 

Rhetorical techniques